Dujone is a Bengali-language streaming television series streaming on hoichoi from July 9, 2021. The series stars Soham Chakraborty, Srabanti Chatterjee making their OTT debuts in the lead roles. The series is directed by Promita Bhattacharya, who also worked on the screenplay along with Mitali Ojha and Romit Ojha.

Plot 
The story is centered on an imminent terrorist attack and mistaken identities — a woman suspects her husband is hiding something after suffering from a near-death experience. She follows him to keep tabs on him. The series has two parallel stories — one where the Intelligence Bureau is trying to impede an attack from China, the other concerns an affluent family in Kolkata where things alter post their heir's mishap. After Amar Basu Thakur's unfortunate accident, he seems to be forgetting things, and only his wife Ahana notices this. With her efforts yielding no result, she approaches a private detective. As it turns out that her husband is far from the man she thought him to be.

Cast 
 Soham Chakraborty as Amor
 Srabanti Chatterjee as Ahana
 Rajdeep Gupta as Proshit
 Debshankar Haldar as Rajat
 Kamaleshwar Mukherjee as IB Chief
 Anindita Saha Kapileshwari as Bibha
 Adrija Addy Roy as Kalki
 Indrajit Mazumder
 Poulomi Das

Episodes

Season 1 (2021)
On 9 July 2021 hoichoi released the Dujone original series with 10 episodes.

Episodes

References

External links

Indian web series
2017 web series debuts
Bengali-language web series
Hoichoi original programming